Chuang Tapestry is a Chinese animated film produced by Shanghai Animation Film Studio. It is also referred to as "Chwang Tapestry".

Story
Once upon a time the Chuang family chopped firewood for a living. Mother Tanja spent three years day and night weaving this tapestry. One day a wind storm came and the tapestry flew away. Kam Tong, one of the children, would venture off to the dangerous Tibet mountains to try to get the tapestry back. Very few have ever survived the cave.

Creators

DVD
The film has since been republished on a DVD along with other animation movies.

Awards
 The film was nominated in the Czech Republic 1960 Karlovy Vary International Film Festival

References

External links
 The film at China's Movie Database

1959 animated films
1959 films
Chinese animated films
1950s Mandarin-language films